Özlem Çerçioğlu (born 11 August 1968) is a Turkish politician from the Republican People's Party serving as the mayor of Aydın since 2009. She is Aydın's and her party's first female mayor.

She was born in Nazilli, a district of Aydın, in 1968. She graduated from Selçuk University in 1988. She served as the member of the Grand National Assembly of Turkey from 2002 to 2009 in 22nd and 23rd legislative terms. She was elected as Aydın's mayor in 2009, she was re-elected in 2014 as the first mayor of the metropolitan municipality, and then she was re-confirmed in 2019.

References 
 Our Mayor, Republic of Turkey Aydın Metropolitan Municipality
 Farewell to the Parliament, Hürriyet
 I am proud to be a heeled Efe !, Hürriyet

Women mayors of places in Turkey
Mayors of places in Turkey
Selçuk University alumni
1968 births

Living people